Djúpivogur Airport  is an airport serving Djúpivogur, Iceland.

See also
Transport in Iceland
List of airports in Iceland

References

 Google Earth

External links
 OurAirports - Djúpivogur
 Djúpivogur Airport
 OpenStreetMap - Djúpivogur

Airports in Iceland